The Indian River is a river in Washington County, Maine.
The term "Indian River" is also used to loosely refer to the entire combined townships of Addison and Jonesport ("Indian River District") through which the river passes.

See also
List of rivers of Maine

References

Maine Streamflow Data from the USGS
Maine Watershed Data From Environmental Protection Agency

Rivers of Washington County, Maine